Grande-Anse is an unincorporated community in Gloucester County, New Brunswick, Canada. It held village status prior to 2023.

The community is near the community of Pokeshaw on the shore of Chaleur Bay in the Acadian Peninsula region, 25 km northwest of Caraquet and 45 kilometres east of Bathurst.

Grande-Anse's tourist attractions include the Grande-Anse beach, and the Popes' Museum.

History

The village was first settled by Acadian Simon Landry in 1808, and was incorporated in 1968.

On 1 January 2023, Grande-Anse amalgamated with Bertrand, Maisonnette, Saint-Léolin, and all or part of four local service districts to form the new town of Rivière-du-Nord. The community's name remains in official use.

Demographics 

Notable people

See also
List of communities in New Brunswick

References

 

Communities in Gloucester County, New Brunswick
Former villages in New Brunswick